Kasikhandamu (Telugu: కాశీఖండము) is a Telugu literary work by 15th century poet Srinatha. It is composed in a poetic form of Prabandha style with strict metre. The main subject is the profile of Kasi or Varanasi, extracted mostly from Kasi Khanda of Skanda Purana.

According to the researcher Nidudavolu Venkata Rao, the author most probably wrote this work in 1440 A.D. and dedicated his work to Sri Veerabhadra Reddy (1423 - 1448) of Reddi kingdom, under whom he was the court-poet. Srinatha was the first poet to take up this translation into Telugu language. Subsequent to him, two other poets Kancherla Sarabhakavi and Mocherla Annaya translated Kasi Khanda in 1500 and 1650 respectively.

Publications

The book was published in 1888 in Madras by Gnana Suryodaya Printing press of Chennakeshavulu Shetti. Subsequently Vavilla Ramaswamy Sastrulu and Sons, Madras published it in 1917 with foreword by Nidudavolu Venkata Rao.

References

Telugu poetry
Books about Varanasi
1888 books
15th-century Indian literature